Dame Diop (born 15 February 1993) is a Senegalese professional footballer who plays as a forward.

Career

Club
Dame Diop started his career at Touré Kunda. He signed with the Russian club FC Khimki, but failed to make a league appearance before going on loan to FC Shirak from Armenia. He joined FC Shirak permanently in 2013.

On 1 August 2014, he signed a two-year contract with Czech Republic's SK Slavia Prague.

On 10 February 2016, Diop signed a two-year contract with FC Fastav Zlín.

On 22 December 2017, he signed a long-term contract with FC Baník Ostrava.

On 7 September 2022, Diop signed for Armenian Premier League club Pyunik. On 17 January 2023, Pyunik announced that Diop had left the club.

International
Dame Diop played made his international debut on 1 June 2014 in a friendly match against Colombia.

Career statistics

International

References

External links
 
 

1993 births
Living people
People from Louga Region
Association football forwards
Senegalese footballers
Czech First League players
Mbour Petite-Côte FC players
FC Khimki players
FC Fastav Zlín players
FC Baník Ostrava players
SK Slavia Prague players
SK Dynamo České Budějovice players
FC Pyunik players
Senegalese expatriate footballers
Expatriate footballers in the Czech Republic
Expatriate footballers in Russia
Expatriate footballers in Armenia
Senegalese expatriate sportspeople in the Czech Republic
Senegalese expatriate sportspeople in Russia
Senegalese expatriate sportspeople in Armenia
Senegal international footballers